Haccağız is a village in the Seben District of Bolu Province in Turkey. Its population is 98 (2021).

References

Villages in Seben District